Mosander is a Swedish surname. Notable people with the surname include:

Carl Gustaf Mosander (1797–1858), Swedish chemist
Jan Mosander (born 1944), Swedish journalist and author 
Ingalill Mosander (born 1943), Swedish journalist, wife of Jan

Swedish-language surnames